ʿAmr ibn Mattā or Mattai al-Ṭīrhānī (Amru ibn Matta) was the author of a 14th-century work known as The Book of the Tower. Ibn Matta's work is modelled after, and takes its title from, the Book of the Tower by 12th-century Nestorian writer Mari ibn Suleiman. Ibn Matta's work is discussed in a lengthy entry in the ecclesiastical encyclopedia Miṣbāḥ al-Zulma by  Ibn Kabar (d. 1324). 

Based on his nisbah, ibn Matta was a native of Ṭīrhān, a district now part of the city of  Samarra, Iraq.

References
N. Swanson, Mark. "ʿAmr ibn Mattā." Christian-Muslim Relations 600 - 1500, Brill Online, 2016.

Syriac Christians
14th-century writers
People from Samarra